Wah Leong Jay (June 15, 1917 – May 29, 2011), better known as Wally Jay, was an American martial artist who primarily studied and taught jujutsu and judo. He was the founder of the Gendai Budo martial art Small Circle JuJitsu.

Biography 
Jay was born in Hawaii of Chinese descent.  At age 11, he began to study boxing under a community program. By the age of 18 he was studying jujitsu under Paul Kaelemakule. In 1938, Wally enrolled at Oregon State College where he studied medicine and agriculture. In 1940, he studied Danzan Ryu jujutsu under Juan Gomez and learned judo under the former Hawaiian Champion, Ken Kawachi. Jay and his wife Bernice were awarded a Certificate of Mastery by Seishiro Okazaki, the founder of Danzan Ryu jujutsu, on February 22, 1948.

Jay spent time with Bruce Lee and his associates in 1962 teaching them judo and jujutsu techniques 

Jay was the head instructor of Jay's Jujitsu Studio, which is also known as Island Judo/Jujitsu Club in Alameda, California. Even past the age of 90, he traveled worldwide teaching seminars on Small Circle Jujitsu. Jay published two books; Dynamic Ju Jitsu and Small Circle JuJitsu and numerous 
instructional videos.

During the 1990s Wally Jay, Remy Presas (Modern Arnis), and George Dillman (Kyusho Jitsu) traveled together throughout the United States and worldwide promulgating small-circle jujitsu.  Remy Presas incorporated elements of Small Circle JuJitsu   into Modern Arnis.  Jack Hogan continues to promote and advance the principles of Wally Jay's small-circle jujitsu having incorporated a multitude of the techniques into Hogan Karate International and the Kyusho Certification Program.

In 1969, Jay was inducted into Black Belt Magazine’s Black Belt Hall of Fame as “Ju-Jitsu Sensei of the Year” and again in 1990 as “Man of the Year”.

In August 2002, Jay held a ceremony officially handing the title of grandmaster over to his son Leon Jay in their hometown of Alameda, California. Family, friends, several martial arts masters and the media witnessed the occasion.

Notable Achievements
 In 1964, Professor Wally Won the AJI Outstanding Coach Award
 In 1968, a student of the Professor's - David Quinonez - won the National High School Judo Championship 120 Pound Crown
 In 1969, the Professor was inducted into the Black Belt Hall of Fame for his contributions to the art of judo
 In 1970, another student of the Professor's - Bradford Burgo - won the National High School Judo Championship 120 Pound Crown 
 In 1972, the Professor retired from the U.S Postal Service and went back to school, eventually earning his B.A from Sonoma State College
 In 1977, the Professor and various colleagues founded Jujitsu America
 In 1980, the Professor was inducted into the Black Belt Hall of Fame for his contributions to the art of jujitsu
 In 1985, the Professor was the first person to be invited to captain an American team at the International Wushu Championship in Xian, China
 In 1990, the Professor was named Black Belt's Man of the Year
 In 1991, the Professor was awarded an Honorary Dotorate by the College of Martial Arts in Sioux Falls, South Dakota
 In 1992, the Professor was invited to demonstrate his art at Japan's Dai Nippon Butokuden
 In 1993, the Professor was inducted into the Danzan-ryū Hall of Fame
 In 1999, the Professor was named on Inside Kung Fu'ss Most influential Martial Artists

Death
Jay suffered a stroke on May 24, 2011. He was later removed from life support according to his stated wishes and died on May 29, 2011, at the age of 93.

Small Circle JuJitsu 

Randall (Sugar) Ray Boggs Jr from jacksonville Florida is the only fighter to be sponsored by the gym. Randall Ray Boggs Jr had all his accomplishments stripped after a drug incident around but is set to make his comeback on the 28th of october 2022 will he be the phenom we last saw orna shell of his self who has sadly passed his prime being suspended since 2015.
AMATEUR RESULTS
Showing 5 of *20
All 20 wins stripped
Mikey Mitchell
1-1-0
Randall Ray Boggs jr
3-0
Sugar Ray (V) by · Knock Out · 0:56 · R2
New Line Cagefighting 2
2015.06.15
Nicholas Fisher
2-1-0
Randall sugar Ray Boggs Jr
3-0-0
Sugar Ray (V) · Nicholas Didn't Answer Bell due to blood loss
2:00· R2
New Line Cagefighting
2015.03.09
Richard Vandall Cancelled Bout
2015.08.28
Richard Vandall
0-0-0
3-0-0
Randall Sugar Ray Boggs Jr
Randall Sugar Ray Boggs Jr
(Win) · Decision · Split
King of Jacksonville 13
2015.08.06
 king of Jacksonville 13 stripped.
With a spectacular *45 AMATEUR boxing wins with 32 knockouts from age 9-23
45 wins stripped
He has strong MMA heritage with the Boggs name being celebrated by all in the MMA community. 7 members of his family are MMA legends Ernie Lightfoot Boggs created his own type of MMA being the first American to win a gold metal in the Olympics for MMA until this day thinks "Sugar Ray (Randall Boggs Jr) Was a rising star that let influences around him extinguish his flame."

Bibliography 
 Small-Circle Jujitsu (August 1989) 
 Dynamic Ju Jitsu

References

External links 
 Small Circle Jujitsu
 Small Circle Jujitsu France
 Small Circle Jujitsu Montpellier

1917 births
2011 deaths
American male judoka
American jujutsuka
American people of Chinese descent
Martial arts school founders
Sportspeople from Honolulu
20th-century American people